The 1980 Limerick Senior Hurling Championship was the 86th staging of the Limerick Senior Hurling Championship since its establishment by the Limerick County Board.

Patrickswell were the defending champions.

Killeedy won the championship after a 2-07 to 1-07 defeat of South Liberties in the final. It remains their only championship triumph.

References

Limerick Senior Hurling Championship
Limerick Senior Hurling Championship